Pseudoeurycea tlahcuiloh, commonly known as the green-flecked salamander, is a species of salamander in the family Plethodontidae.
It is endemic to Mexico.

Its natural habitat is subtropical or tropical moist montane forests.
It is threatened by habitat loss.

References

Sources

Amphibians of Mexico
Pseudoeurycea
Amphibians described in 1996
Taxonomy articles created by Polbot